Patrick Neill may refer to:

 Patrick Neill (naturalist) (1776–1851), Scottish printer, naturalist and travel writer
 Patrick Neill, Baron Neill of Bladen (1926–2016), member of the House of Lords